Caroline Mtukule (born 19 April 1984) is a Malawian netball player who plays for Malawi in the positions of goal defense or goal keeper. She has featured in four consecutive World Cup tournaments for Malawi in 2007, 2011, 2015 and in 2019. She has also competed at the Commonwealth Games on four successive occasions in 2006, 2010. 2014 and in 2018 representing Malawi.

References 

1984 births
Living people
Malawian netball players
Netball players at the 2006 Commonwealth Games
Netball players at the 2010 Commonwealth Games
Netball players at the 2014 Commonwealth Games
Netball players at the 2018 Commonwealth Games
Commonwealth Games competitors for Malawi
2019 Netball World Cup players